Marietta is a city in, and the county seat of, Washington County, Ohio, United States. As of the 2020 census, Marietta has a population of 13,385 people. It is the principal city of the Marietta micropolitan area, which includes all of Washington County, and is the second-largest city in the Parkersburg–Marietta–Vienna combined statistical area.

Founded in 1788 by pioneers to the Ohio Country, Marietta was the first permanent U.S. settlement in the newly established Northwest Territory, created in 1787, and what would later become the state of Ohio. It is named for Marie Antoinette, then Queen of France, in honor of French aid in the American Revolution. Prior to American settlement, the area was inhabited by various native tribes of the Hopewell tradition, who built the Marietta Earthworks, a complex more than 1,500 years old, whose Great Mound and other major monuments were preserved by the earliest settlers in parks such as Mound Cemetery. Since 1835 the city has been home to Marietta College, a private, nonsectarian liberal arts school with approximately 1,200 students. Leading up to the American Civil War, the city was a station on the Underground Railroad.

History

Prehistoric
Succeeding Indigenous cultures lived along the Ohio River and its tributaries for thousands of years. Among them were more than one culture who built earthwork mounds, monuments which generally expressed their cosmology, often with links to astronomical events.

Between 100 BC and AD 500, the Hopewell culture built the multi-earthwork complex on the terrace east of the Muskingum River near its mouth with the Ohio. It is now known as the Marietta Earthworks. Developed over many years, it had a large enclosed square, within which were four platform mounds, used for ceremonial purposes and elite residential; another square, and a larger conical mound used for burials. A walled, graded path led to the river's edge. By the time of the historic tribes, such as the Shawnee, the purposes and makers of the monuments were no longer known.

Settlement

French explorers entered this area in the 18th century, and in 1749 buried numerous leaden plates to mark their claim to the Ohio Country (which they called the Illinois Territory, as they had more settlements near the Mississippi River.) They later ceded their territory east of the Mississippi to Great Britain after the French and Indian War. Two of their plates were discovered in the Marietta area in 1798, and one was replicated for what is known as the French monument, erected in the 20th century (see photo).

In 1770, the future U.S. president George Washington, then a surveyor, began exploring large tracts of land west of his native Virginia. During the Revolutionary War, Washington told his friend General Rufus Putnam of the beauty he had seen in his travels through the Ohio Valley and of his ideas for settling the territory.  In the summer of 1781, John Carpenter built Carpenter's Fort, or Carpenter's Station as it was sometimes called, a fortified house above the mouth of Short Creek on the Ohio side of the Ohio River, near present-day Marietta.

After the American Revolutionary War, the U.S. sold or granted large tracts of land to stimulate development in this area. Marietta was founded by settlers from New England who were investors in the Ohio Company of Associates. It was the first of numerous New England settlements in what was then the Northwest Territory. These New Englanders, or "Yankees" as they were called, were descended from the Puritan English colonists who had settled New England in the 1600s and were primarily Congregationalists. The first church constructed in Marietta was a Congregationalist church, founded around 1786. Before the mid-1790s services were held at the fort or in Munsell's Hall at nearby Point Harmar. In 1798 the Muskingum Academy was built on the site of the 19th century Marietta Congregationalist Church. The academy building served for both educational and religious purposes.

After the war, the newly formed United States had little cash but plenty of land. Eager to develop additional lands, the new government decided to pay veterans of the Revolution with warrants for land in the Northwest Territory, which was organized under federal authority in 1787 by the Northwest Ordinance. Competing states had agreed to end their claims to the lands; Pennsylvania and Virginia received some lands in a settlement. Arthur St. Clair was appointed by the president as governor of the new territory. He was inaugurated on a site now marked by the Start Westward Memorial.

The Ohio Company of Associates had supported provisions in the ordinance to allow veterans to use their warrants to purchase the land. They bought 1.5 million acres (6,100 km2) of land from Congress. On April 7, 1788, 48 men of the Ohio Company of Associates, led by General Putnam, arrived at the confluence of the Muskingum and Ohio rivers. The site was on the east side of the Muskingum River, across from Fort Harmar, a military outpost built three years prior.

Bringing with them the first government sanctioned by the US for this area, they established the first permanent United States settlement in the Northwest Territory. (Older European settlements in the Northwest Territory region include Sault Ste. Marie, Michigan, 1668; Cahokia, Illinois, 1696, Detroit, 1701; Kaskaskia, Illinois, 1703, Ouiatenon, Indiana, 1717, Prairie du Rocher, Illinois, 1720; Vincennes, Indiana, 1732, Clarksville, Indiana, 1783, Martin's Ferry, Ohio, 1785, Fort Finney/Jeffersonville, Indiana, 1786, most settled by ethnic French colonists from Canada.) The Americans named Marietta in honor of Marie Antoinette, the Queen of France, who had aided the colonies in their battle for independence from Great Britain.

The Indigenous peoples were unhappy to see white settlers moving into their territory. The latter immediately started construction of two forts: Campus Martius, whose former site is now occupied by the museum of the same name, and Picketed Point Stockade, at the confluence of the Muskingum and Ohio rivers. At the same time, the settlers started developing their community, platted according to plans they had made in Boston.

In 1788, George Washington said: 

The families of the settlers began arriving within a few months. By the end of 1788, 137 people populated the area.

In 1789, the United States signed the Treaty of Fort Harmar with several Indigenous tribes that occupied areas of the Northwest Territory, to settle issues related to trade, as well as the boundary between their lands and United States settlement. The US did not address the Indigenous people's major grievance about American settlers moving into their lands, particularly in the Western Reserve, where there were disputes over land. Although Congress authorized Governor Arthur St. Clair to give land back to the Indigenous people, he did not do so. Conflict increased as the Indigenous people tried to push the settlers out. After years of warfare in the region, they were defeated. The US signed the Treaty of Greenville (1795) with the Indigenous people, which secured the safety of settlers to leave the forts and develop their farms.

The settlers held services regularly and chartered the first church in 1799. It was a Congregational institution; its charter was unusually inclusive due to the varied religious backgrounds of its members. The congregation constructed the first church building in 1807. The original church burned in 1905 and another constructed in its place in 1906. The church, First Congregational Church United Church of Christ, is the longest continuously worshiping congregation west of the Alleghenies.

Education was important to the settlers, many of whom had been officers during the Revolution. During that first winter, they began a basic school for the children at Campus Martius. In 1797, settlers founded Muskingum Academy. The town had numerous abolitionists, and Ephraim Cutler was instrumental as a state delegate in 1802 at the state convention in swaying the vote for the state to be free of slavery.

19th century

Townspeople organized and chartered Marietta College in 1835. It was used as a station on the Underground Railroad to help slaves escape from the South. Ohio University was founded earlier in Athens, on land reserved for public education under the Northwest Ordinance.

The settlers preserved the Great Mound, or Conus, by planning their own cemetery around it. They also preserved the two largest platform mounds, which they called Capitolinus and Quadrophenus. The former was developed as the site for the city library. As of 1900, the Mound Cemetery had the highest number of burials of Revolutionary War officers in the nation, indicating the nature of the generation that settled Marietta.

Marietta's location on two major navigable rivers made it ideal for industry and commerce. Boat building was one of the early industries. Artisans built oceangoing vessels and sailed them downriver to the Mississippi and south to New Orleans and the Gulf of Mexico. In less than two decades after settlement, the steamboat had been developed, and was also constructed here. Brick factories and sawmills supplied materials for homes and public buildings. An iron mill, along with several foundries, provided rails for the growing railroad industry; the Marietta Chair Factory made furniture.

Interest in the prehistoric culture that built the Marietta Earthworks continued. The complex was surveyed and drawn by Ephraim George Squier and Edwin Hamilton Davis, whose large project on numerous prehistoric mounds throughout the Ohio and Mississippi valleys was published by the Smithsonian Institution in 1848 as Ancient Monuments of the Mississippi Valley. It was the first book published by the Smithsonian. Their drawing above shows the plan of the original complex, which "included a large square enclosure surrounding four flat-topped pyramidal mounds, another smaller square, and a circular enclosure with a large burial mound at its center." The walled, graded path, called by the settlers the Sacra Via, led from the largest enclosure to the lower river's edge. This pathway was destroyed in 1843 during mid-nineteenth century development.

Railroads and oil
Local development began with the Belpre and Cincinnati Railroad (B&C); it was founded in 1845. It was intended to connect from Belpre, Ohio, the next town downriver, to a planned Baltimore and Ohio Railroad (B&O) spur to Parkersburg. But, for years, the Virginia government did not allow the B&O to construct track south of Wheeling. In 1851 developers changed the Ohio state terminus to Marietta and changed the name of the railroad to the Marietta and Cincinnati Railroad that year. The right-of-way for an alternate connection to the B&O extended upriver from Marietta to Bellaire, Ohio. The M&C was bankrupt by 1857, but construction of track continued west to reach Cincinnati. The first through-train from Cincinnati ran on April 9, 1857. The M&C got out of bankruptcy in 1860.

In 1871, the Ohio Valley Railroad was formed and for the next two years built tracks going north for 103 miles. Their home office was in Marietta, with treasurer offices in Pittsburgh. The Ohio Valley railroad was reorganized as the Marietta and Cleveland. The Pennsylvania Railroad in its expansion later purchased the railroad and its right-of-way between Marietta and Bellaire.

Passengers traveling between Marietta and Parkersburg, Virginia (now West Virginia) had to take a steamboat for the 14 miles between the two towns and transfer. With help from the B&O and the Baltimore City Council, the Union Railroad finally connected Marietta to Belpre, Ohio in 1860. Later absorbed by the B&O, this section of track is still in operation (2008), with unit coal trains providing most of the traffic.

The planned bridge from Parkersburg across the Ohio River to Belpre was finally built 1868–1870 by the B&O, as part of its main line from Baltimore to St. Louis, Missouri. This cut Marietta off from traffic and trade, although it retained local and Ohio service. In the early 20th century, 24 passenger trains served Marietta each day, most of which ran on the PRR tracks.

William P. Cutler was a major figure in the M&C. He also backed the Union Railroad and the Marietta, Columbus and Cleveland Railroad, among other local railroads. Cutler served as General Manager and as President of the M&C for many years.

In 1860, oil was first drilled in the Marietta region. Oil booms in 1875 and 1910 made investors rich, who constructed numerous lavish houses in town, of which many still stand. The Dawes brothers of Marietta founded the Pure Oil Company. All four brothers became nationally prominent businessmen and/or politicians: Charles Gates Dawes, Rufus C. Dawes, Beman Gates Dawes and Henry May Dawes. Charles Dawes was elected in 1924 with President Calvin Coolidge to serve as the 30th Vice President of the United States (1925–1929). In 1925, he shared the Nobel Peace Prize, based on his work on the Dawes Plan and relieving an international crisis in 1923 related to German reparations after World War I.

In 1880, the first Putnam Street Bridge was opened to connect Marietta to Fort Harmar. It provided the first free crossing of the Muskingum River.

20th century

As transportation advanced along railroads and highways, Marietta was initially passed by. From 1868 to 1870, the B & O Railroad built a bridge to connect Parkersburg, West Virginia and Belpre; and the National Road went further north through Zanesville.

But the Pennsylvania Railroad expanded in the late 19th century and had a station in Marietta, running 26 daily trains between Marietta and Pittsburgh. After WWII passenger service decreased as the railroads restructured and the federal government invested in highway construction. The last rail passenger service ended in 1953. Marietta was relatively isolated from new travel routes until 1967, when I-77 was opened with close access to the city.

Before the United States entered the Great War, a group of 23 young men went from Marietta College to serve in France in 1917 as an ambulance unit; four died in battle. In 1937–1938, during the US celebration of the Northwest Territory, France gave a plaque to the city of Marietta, which was installed on the French monument, to commemorate these young men and their service.
In 1939, the Sons and Daughters of Pioneer Rivermen was established in Marietta during the Great Depression to celebrate the city's substantial river history and its people. Two years later the Ohio River Museum was opened. In 1972, the museum campus was totally redesigned.

The 2016 Ohio State of the State address was held at People's Bank Theater on April 6. The speech was given by governor John Kasich.

Geography

The Muskingum River and Duck Creek flow into the Ohio River at Marietta. The area is part of the Appalachian Plateau which covers the eastern half of Ohio. The Appalachian Plateau consists of steep hills and valleys and is the most rugged area in the state. The area is within the ecoregion of the Western Allegheny Plateau. This portion of the state has some of Ohio's most abundant mineral deposits.

Marietta was affected by the Great Flood of 1913.

Climate
The climate in this area is characterized by humid summers, cold winters, and evenly distributed precipitation throughout the year that can not be accurately predicted because of the amount of water in the Ohio Valley. According to the Köppen Climate Classification system, Marietta has a Humid continental climate, abbreviated "Dfa" on climate maps.

Environmental issues
Eramet has released thousands of pounds of manganese and other hazardous air pollutants into the air.

Demographics

2010 census
As of the 2010 census,  there were 14,085 people, 5,828 households, and 3,215 families residing in the city. The racial makeup of the city was 94.9% White, 1.3% African American, 0.3% Native American, 1.4% Asian, 0.5% from other races, and 1.5% from two or more races. Hispanic or Latino of any race were 1.1% of the population.

There were 5,828 households, of which 25.3% had children under the age of 18 living with them, 37.9% were married couples living together, 13.0% had a female householder with no husband present, 4.3% had a male householder with no wife present, and 44.8% were non-families. 37.4% of all households were made up of individuals, and 15.7% had someone living alone who was 65 years of age or older. The average household size was 2.14 and the average family size was 2.80.

The median age in the city was 39 years. 18.9% of residents were under the age of 18; 16% were between the ages of 18 and 24; 21.1% were from 25 to 44; 25.7% were from 45 to 64; and 18.4% were 65 years of age or older. The gender makeup of the city was 46.9% male and 53.1% female.

Economy

Marietta is home of the longest-running ferromanganese refinery in North America, Eramet Marietta Industries Inc., the only ferromanganese refinery in the United States until recently, and leader in Manganese emissions.

Arts and culture

Since 1975, the Ohio River Sternwheel Festival has been held on the weekend after Labor Day in September. 2021 was the 45th annual event, which attracts dozens of Sternwheelers to the banks of the Ohio River near downtown Marietta. The Festival includes performances from musical artists, Sternwheel races, and a large fireworks display; it attracts tens of thousands of visitors from across the country. 

The Riverfront Roar powerboat races are held annually in July. The event includes Formula 2 and Formula 3 powerboat racing along the Ohio River. A number of rowing regattas are held throughout the spring. Chief among them Marietta High School's Ralph Lindamood Memorial Regatta and the Marietta Invitational Regatta hosted by Marietta College, which brings some of the nation's fastest college rowing programs to the Muskingum River. In the fall season, the "Head of the Muskingum" head race is held, again drawing rowing teams from across the country. The race is run over a 3–3.5 mile course starting in Devola, Ohio and ending at Marietta College's Lindamood-Van Voorhis Boathouse. 

A Marietta Civil War Reenactment is also held at the end of September. It includes Union and Confederate reenactors battling across the scenic Muskingum River. Goodfest is held at Goodfellows Park; this local music festival for teenagers features local musicians in a drug & alcohol-free environment.

Government

Local government
Marietta uses the mayor-council form of government. The mayor is a full-time position; the seven city council members and the city council president are all part-time positions.

Marietta politics feature a number of citizens groups that influence policy and public opinion. Such groups as Citizens for Responsible Government, the Citizen's Armory Preservation Society, and Neighbors for Clean Air work to improve the public process and exercise significant influence over the government of the city.

State and federal government
The residents of the city of Marietta are represented by Republican Jay Edwards (District 94) and by Republican Don Jones in the Ohio House of Representatives and Republican Frank Hoagland (District 30) in the Ohio Senate.

In the U.S. House of Representatives, Marietta is represented by Republican Bill Johnson.

Education
As of 2021, the Marietta City School District operates three elementary schools (two preK-2nd and one 3rd-6th), and one building that houses a middle/high school, Marietta High School. Phillips Elementary and Washington Elementary house the preK-2nd grades. The elementary school that houses 3rd-6th grades is located in the building that was previously the middle school.

Marietta has a public library, a branch of the Washington County Public Library.

Infrastructure

Transportation

Highways
Interstate 77 runs east of Marietta connecting it to Cleveland, Ohio, to the north and Charleston, West Virginia, to the south.

Five state routes run through Marietta. These are: Ohio State Route 7, Ohio State Route 60, Ohio State Route 26, Ohio State Route 550, and Ohio State Route 676.

Air
Marietta is served by Mid-Ohio Valley Regional Airport in Williamstown, West Virginia, which has three flights a day Monday through Friday from Charlotte Douglas International Airport.

Notable people

Notable people on the List of early settlers of Marietta, Ohio include: Arthur St. Clair, Major General and Patriot in the revolutionary war, 9th President of the Continental Congress, he was the first governor of the Northwest Territory; Gen. Rufus Putnam, Gen. Benjamin Tupper, Gen. James Varnum, Gen. Samuel Holden Parsons, Commodore Abraham Whipple, Col. William Stacy, and Griffin Greene.

Other notable people include:
 Levi Barber, was a surveyor, court administrator, banker, and member of the Ohio House of Representatives, Fifteenth United States Congress, & Seventeenth United States Congress
 Dewey F. Bartlett, 19th Governor of Oklahoma, United States Senator
 Mary Bird Lake, the town's first Sunday school teacher.
 Hobart Bosworth, movie actor, director, writer and producer.
 John Brough, 26th Governor of Ohio, Member of the Ohio House of Representatives
 Clem S. Clarke, oilman and Republican politician from Shreveport, Louisiana; born in Marietta in 1897
 William Cutler, Member of the Ohio House of Representatives
 Charles G. Dawes, 30th Vice President of the United States
 Rufus Dawes, Union Brigadier General who commanded troops as part of Wisconsin's Iron Brigade at Gettysburg. Later served as a member of the United States House of Representatives.
 Larry Dickson, auto racer
 Charles H. Elston, member of the United States House of Representatives
 Althea Flynt, pornographic model, and wife of magazine magnate, Larry Flynt
 Marion Havighurst, poet, novelist, and children's author
 Samuel Prescott Hildreth, pioneer physician, scientist, and historian
 Nancy Hollister, 66th Governor of Ohio, Lieutenant Governor of Ohio, member of the Ohio House of Representatives
 Perley Brown Johnson, Member of the Ohio House of Representatives
 Alf Landon, 26th Governor of Kansas, 1936 Republican Presidential Candidate
 Francis B. Loomis, 25th United States Assistant Secretary of State
 Return Jonathan Meigs, Jr., 4th Governor of Ohio and 5th United States Postmaster General
 Vinnie Mele (born 1977), singer, actor, composer, and instrumentalist
 Robert Oliver (soldier) (1738–1810), American Revolutionary War lieutenant colonel and politician
 C. William O'Neill, 59th Governor of Ohio, Speaker of the Ohio House of Representatives, Associate & Chief Justice of the Ohio Supreme Court, Attorney General of the State of Ohio
 Harrison Gray Otis, Los Angeles Times
 Greg Pryor, former Major League Baseball infielder
 Warner Wing, Michigan jurist and legislator
 George White, 52nd Governor of Ohio
 William A. Whittlesey, former US Congressman
 Chief Zimmer, major league baseball player and manager

Sister cities
 Gautier, Mississippi, and  Rutland, Massachusetts.

See also
 List of cities and towns along the Ohio River
 List of mayors of Marietta, Ohio
 Washington State Community College
 Marietta College

References

External links

 Marietta Area Chamber of Commerce

 
1788 establishments in the Northwest Territory
Cities in Ohio
Cities in Washington County, Ohio
County seats in Ohio
Former colonial and territorial capitals in the United States
Marie Antoinette
Muskingum River
Ohio populated places on the Ohio River
Populated places established in 1788
Populated places on the Underground Railroad